Birtukan Ayano Dadi (born 1975) is an Ethiopian judge and diplomat. From 2013 to 2017 she was Ethiopia's Ambassador to Canada. Since 2018 she has been State Minister of the Ethiopia's Ministry of Foreign Affairs.

Life
Birtukan Ayano Dadi was born in Arsi Province on 12 November 1975. After an attempt to abduct her, she moved to Bale Province and was educated at Robe High School. She trained to be a teacher at Bale Teachers’ Training Institute, and worked as an elementary and junior secondary school teacher.

In 2003 Birtukan gained an LL.B. degree from the Ethiopian Civil Service University. From 2003 to 2006 she was a judge in the High Court of Oromia State.

In January 2006 Birtukan joined the Ministry of Foreign Affairs. She became secretary and then counselor at the Ethiopian Embassy, Ottawa, and counselor at the Ethiopian general consulate in Toronto. From July 2011 to May 2013 she became Senior Counselor of the International Treaties and Legal Affairs Directorate General at the Ministry of Foreign Affairs. From May 2013 to November 2017 she was Ethiopia's Ambassador to Canada. In December 2017 she became Ethiopia's Director General of American Affairs. In May 2018 she was appointed State Minister of Foreign Affairs.

References

External links
 H. E Ambassador Birtukan Ayano Dadi

1975 births
Living people
Ethiopian judges
Women ambassadors
Ambassadors of Ethiopia to Canada
People from Oromia Region